Silphium is a genus of North American plants in the tribe Heliantheae within the family Asteraceae.

In the rosinweeds, the outer florets in the head are fertile and the inner florets are sterile; in the sunflowers, the reverse is true.

The name of the genus comes from the Ancient Greek word for a North African plant whose identity has been lost, though it is known its gum or juice was prized by the ancients as a medicine and a condiment.

Species
Species in the genus include:
 Silphium albiflorum A.Gray – white rosinweed – TX
 Silphium asteriscus L. – starry rosinweed – TX OK LA AR MO IL IN KY TN AL MS GA FL SC NC VA WV OH MD PA NY
 Silphium brachiatum Gatt. – Cumberland rosinweed – TN AL GA
 Silphium compositum Michx. – kidneyleaf rosinweed – TN AL GA FL SC NC VA WV
 Silphium glutinosum J.R. Allison AL
 Silphium integrifolium Michx. – wholeleaf rosinweed – NM TX LA OK AR MO KS CO WY SD NE IA IL IN KY TN MS AL WI MI MA ONT
 Silphium laciniatum L. – compassplant – NM TX LA OK AR MO KS CO SD NE MN IA IL IN KY TN MS AL WI MI VA PA NY ONT
 Silphium laeve Hook. 
 Silphium mohrii Small – Mohr's rosinweed – TN AL GA
 Silphium perfoliatum L. – cup plant – NM TX LA OK AR MO KS CO SD ND NE MN IA IL INKY TN MS AL WI MI NC VA DE PA NY NJ CT RI MA VT NH ME ONT QUE NB
 Silphium perplexum J.R.Allison – Old Cahaba rosinweed – AL
 Silphium pinnatifidum Elliott – Cutleaf prairie dock – AL GA KY TN
 Silphium radula Nutt. – roughstem rosinweed – KS MO AR OK TX LA
 Silphium terebinthinaceum Jacq. – prairie rosinweed, prairie dock – IA MO AR MS AL GA SC NC VA WV TN KY OH IN IL WI MI NY ONT
 Silphium ternatum Sessé & Moc. – Mexico
 Silphium trifoliatum L. – whorled rosinweed – AL GA IN KY MD NC SC OH PA VA WV
 Silphium wasiotense M.Medley – Appalachian rosinweed – KY TN

Formerly included
Numerous species are now regarded as members of the genera Berlandiera and Verbesina.

See also
 Genus Calycadenia – the western rosinweeds

References

External links 
 
 
 

 
Asteraceae genera
Flora of North America